Cerion alberti is a species of terrestrial gastropod in the family Cerionidae. It is endemic to coastal vegetation in the Ramón de Antilla Peninsula, Cuba. C. alberti is the most restricted species of Cerion in the Holguin Province, occurring within only 1 km2 of sea grapes and coastal vegetation. Historical collections have reported a Cañón de Banes locality, in which several species including C. alberti occur.

References 

Cerionidae
Invertebrates of Cuba
Gastropods described in 1949
Endemic fauna of Cuba